To Drive the Cold Winter Away is Loreena McKennitt's second album, released in 1987. It pays homage to her childhood memories of music for the winter season, the most vivid of which "came from songs and carols recorded in churches or great halls, rich with their own unique ambience and tradition."

To capture that remembered ambiance, McKennitt kept the arrangements sparse, celebrating the beauty of simplicity. She also chose to leave the found sounds of life in the performances, which were recorded on location in churches and great halls:
 The Church of Our Lady in Guelph, Ontario, Canada
 Glenstal Abbey, A Benedictine Monastery near Limerick, Ireland
 Annaghmakerrig (The Tyrone Guthrie Centre) in County Monaghan, Ireland

Track listing
 "In Praise of Christmas" (traditional) – 6:06
 "The Seasons" (traditional) – 4:55
 "The King" (traditional) – 2:04
 "Banquet Hall" (McKennitt) – 3:53
 "Snow" (Archibald Lampman, McKennitt) – 5:35
 "Balulalow" (traditional) – 3:09
 "Let Us the Infant Greet" (traditional) – 3:46
 "The Wexford Carol" (traditional) – 6:07
 "The Stockford Carol" (McKennitt) – 3:02
 "Let All That Are to Mirth Inclined" (traditional) – 6:52

Song information

 "The King" features vocals by Cedric Smith. Shannon Purves-Smith plays Viols on two other tracks. Everything else was done by McKennitt.
 "Snow" uses the words of the poem of the same name by Archibald Lampman. It was included on a Windham Hill Records album titled Celtic Christmas (1995).

Certifications

References

1987 Christmas albums
Loreena McKennitt albums
Christmas albums by Canadian artists
Folk Christmas albums